Herbert Hill may refer to:
Herbert Hill (basketball) (born 1984), American basketball player
Herbert Hill (baseball) (1891–1970), baseball player
Herbert Hill (footballer) (1887–1955), Australian footballer
Herbert Hill (labor director) (1924–2004), labor director of the National Association for the Advancement of Colored People
Herbert Hill (cricketer), English cricketer